Ethernet Consist Network (ECN) is a train communication network based on Ethernet technology standardised with IEC-61375-3-. This is a vehicle (consist) communication like Multifunction Vehicle Bus (MVB) in train communication network (TCN).

ECN is organised in a ring topology to provide redundancy in the event of cable or component failure. It provides an Internet Protocol (IP) interface to TCMS (train control and management system) and other systems within a vehicle (consist).

The Ethernet technology's large bandwidth (typically 100 Mbit/s) is particularly suitable for data-intensive systems like video surveillance or passenger information systems.

See also 
 Ethernet Train Backbone (ETB)

References

External links 

Industrial Ethernet
Network topology
Networking standards
Ethernet standards